Balzarine (Balzorine) was a cotton and worsted fabric of the 19th century. It was a lightweight union cloth made of cotton and wool.

Characteristics and use 
Balzarine was a thin and light woven texture meant for summer dresses for women. The cloth was produced as figured gauze on a Jaquard loom. The figured cloth was also called Balzarine brocade. Balzarine was very close to Barege.

Mourning cloth 
Balzarine was used for mourning clothes.

See also 

 Crêpe (textile)
 Radzimir

References 

Woven fabrics
Figured fabrics
History of clothing